[[File:Alfred Stieglitz - The Last Joke Bellagio, 1887.jpg|thumb|Alfred Stieglitz's The Last Joke, Bellagio, also known as A Good Joke was to win first place in the Amateur Photographers "Photographic Holiday Work Competition", appearing in the 25 November 1887 issue.]]Amateur Photographer''' is a British photography magazine, published weekly by Kelsey Media. The magazine provides articles on equipment reviews, photographic technique, and profiles of professional photographers.

 About the magazine Amateur Photographer was first published on 10 October 1884 by Hazell, Watson and Viney, making it over 130 years old. It has established itself as the world's number one weekly photography magazine. Some of the most renowned photographers such as Alfred Stieglitz, Frank Meadow Sutcliffe, David Bailey and Bob Carlos Clarke have written for the magazine over the years.

This magazine is now owned by Kelsey Media which acquired it (with World Soccer) from Future plc after Future acquired TI Media, the previous owner of the magazine.

 Regular features AP (as it is referred to) is usually based around the following items:AP News - information on the world of film and digital photography; including details of product launches, external competitions and upcoming events (festivals, events, galleries and camera clubs).
Letters - Readers letters concerning recent events, views on photography and feedback on AP articles. Sponsored by Fujifilm UK, film or digital media is provided for all letters published.
Photo Insight - Each week one of four photographers explains the ideas and techniques behind a particular photograph.
Reader Spotlight - Readers photographs. Readers can submit up to 10 photographs (not needing to be themed) on film or digital media. A selection of these is published each week. The 'Editor's Choice' each week is paid £50.APs Icons of Photography - A camera, photograph, photographer or other notable figure from photographic history.AP Test Bench - APs tests of the latest photography equipment.
Ask AP - Technical help in response to readers letters and emails.
Vendor Adverts/Classifieds - A wide selection of UK and international equipment vendors (some offering preferential rates to AP readers); and APs own classified ads for readers to submit.
Final Analysis - Weekly essay from Roger Hicks.

 Amateur Photographer of the Year (APOY) APOY is an annual competition run by Amateur Photographer, and is open to anyone that earns less than 10% of their yearly salary from photography.

Each year's competition is run on a monthly basis, with each month having a dedicated "theme" for the images to adhere to. The APOY judges than narrow the entries down to a short list of 50. From there, the final 'Top 30' are awarded points and published in the magazine; with the top three places being awarded prize donated by Canon UK. All 30 point scoring photographers are entered into the league table; which is edited after each round. After all ten rounds, the photographer with the highest score in the league table is crowned the Amateur Photographer Of the Year and wins £5,000 worth of vouchers.

 Staff, contributors and notable ex-staff 

 Current staff 

Editor: Nigel Atherton
Technical Editor: Andy Westlake
Features Editor: Amy Davies
Technique Editor: Hollie Latham Hucker
Production Editor: Jacqueline Porter
Deputy Editor: Geoff Harris 

Notable ex-members of staff or contributors

Geoffrey Crawley – An expert on the science of photography, as well as the inventor of the Paterson range of developers, Crawley was previously the Editor of the British Journal of Photography'' for 21 years. He is also known for exposing the Cottingley Fairies hoax and advising investigators into the assassination of U.S. President John F. Kennedy. Crawley died in 2010.
Bob Carlos Clarke – Irish; erotic photographer column in the early 1990s.
David Bailey

References

External links

Visual arts magazines published in the United Kingdom
Weekly magazines published in the United Kingdom

Magazines established in 1884
Photography in the United Kingdom
Photography magazines